Márk Petneházi (born 4 October 1988 in Hódmezővásárhely) is a Hungarian football player who currently plays for Budaörsi SC.

References 
Player profile at HLSZ 

1988 births
Living people
People from Hódmezővásárhely
Hungarian footballers
Association football midfielders
Orosháza FC players
Zalaegerszegi TE players
Nyíregyháza Spartacus FC players
Mezőkövesdi SE footballers
Dunaújváros PASE players
FC Ajka players
BFC Siófok players
III. Kerületi TUE footballers
Budaörsi SC footballers
Nemzeti Bajnokság I players
Hungarian expatriate footballers
Expatriate footballers in England
Hungarian expatriate sportspeople in England
Nemzeti Bajnokság II players
Sportspeople from Csongrád-Csanád County